Gjata is an Albanian surname that may refer to:

Arvis Gjata (born 1987), Albanian football midfielder
Elvana Gjata (born 1987), Albanian singer, songwriter and model
Fatmir Gjata (1922–1989), Albanian writer 
Kadri Gjata (1865–1912), Albanian patriot, writer and educator
Kreshnik Gjata (born 1983), Albanian swimmer
Mario Gjata (born 2000), Albanian professional footballer

Albanian-language surnames